Stanley E. Gontarski (born February 27, 1942) specializes in twentieth-century Irish Studies, in British, U.S., and European Modernism, and in performance theory. He is a leading scholar of the work of Samuel Beckett, and is the Robert O. Lawton Distinguished Professor of English at Florida State University.

Works

As editor
 Beckett after Beckett (ed. with Anthony Uhlmann), University Press of Florida, 2006.
 The Faber Companion to Samuel Beckett: A Reader's Guide to His Life, Works, and Thought (with C. J. Ackerly), Faber and Faber, 2006.
 The Grove Companion to Samuel Beckett: A Reader's Guide to His Life, Works, and Thought (with C. J. Ackerley), Grove Press, 2004.
 Beckett in Scena: Interpretazioni Memorabili nel Mondo (Drammaturgia 9), a cura di S. E. Gontarski e Annamaria Cascetta (Roma: Salerno Editrice, 2002).
 The Grove Press Reader, 1951-2001, Grove Press, 2001. [Interview with Grove Press author Hubert Selby, Jr., full text.]
 Modernism, Censorship and the Politics of Publishing, Hanes Foundation, Rare Book Collection, University Library, The University of North Carolina at Chapel Hill, 2000.
 The Theatrical Notebooks of Samuel Beckett, Volume IV: The Shorter Plays, Grove Press (U. S.) and Faber and Faber (UK) 1999.
 Samuel Beckett: The Complete Short Prose, 1928-1989, Grove Press, 1995. [The Readers' Subscription featured selection, 1996–7; and New York Times Book Review "New and Noteworthy Paperbacks"].
 The Beckett Studies Reader, University Presses of Florida, 1993.
 The Theatrical Notebooks of Samuel Beckett, Volume II: Endgame, Grove Press (U. S.) and Faber and Faber (UK) 1993. ["Notable Books of the Year: 1993," New York Times Book Review]
 On Beckett: Essays and Criticism, Grove Press, 1986.

As author
 The Intent of Undoing in Samuel Beckett's Dramatic Texts, Indiana UP, 1985.
 Samuel Beckett: Humanistic Perspectives, Ohio State University Press, 1983. [Finalist for the 1983 Barnard Hewitt Award for outstanding research in theater history.]
 Beckett's "Happy Days": A Manuscript Study, Ohio State University Library Press, 1977.

External links
 Florida State University faculty profile

Gontarski|S.E.
Living people
1942 births
Samuel Beckett scholars